Captain David Peter Seely, 4th Baron Mottistone  (16 December 1920 – 24 November 2011) was a naval officer and British peer.

Seely was born in 1920.  He was the eldest son of the 1st Baron Mottistone from his second marriage to Evelyn Izme Murray daughter of Montolieu Oliphant-Murray, 1st Viscount Elibank and 10th Lord Elibank, and half-brother to Henry John Alexander Seely, 2nd Baron Mottistone and Arthur Patrick William Seely, 3rd Baron Mottistone. He was a grandson of Sir Charles Seely, 1st Baronet. He was baptised with Winston Churchill and the then Duke of Cornwall (subsequently Edward VIII, and then later Duke of Windsor) as his godparents.

He served in the Royal Navy, ultimately reaching the rank of captain. In 1966 he succeeded to the barony and retired from the service.

He was Lord Lieutenant of the Isle of Wight from 1986 to 1995 and the last Governor of the Isle of Wight from 1992 to 1995, where the Seely family have played a prominent role since the 1850s. He was created a Commander of the Order of the British Empire in 1984 and made an Honorary Doctor of Literature by Bournemouth University in 1993. He was also an ex officio member of The Royal Yacht Squadron. He died on 24 November 2011. He was succeeded by his eldest son Peter John Philip Seely, born 29 October 1949, who was a godson of Prince Philip, Duke of Edinburgh.

Arms

See also 

Seely baronets
Baron Mottistone

References

 Obituary in the Daily Telegraph: https://www.telegraph.co.uk/news/obituaries/military-obituaries/naval-obituaries/8973893/Lord-Mottistone.html

External links
Burke's Peerage and Gentry
The Churchill Papers
The Peerage

1920 births
2011 deaths
Barons in the Peerage of the United Kingdom
Commanders of the Order of the British Empire
Knights of the Order of St John
Deputy Lieutenants of the Isle of Wight
Lord Lieutenants of the Isle of Wight
Royal Navy officers of World War II
British military personnel of the Malayan Emergency
David
Mottistone